Jarrad Jansen (born 2 May 1995) is a former professional Australian rules footballer who played for the Brisbane Lions and Geelong Cats in the Australian Football League (AFL).

AFL career

Geelong (2014–2015)

He was drafted as a strong-bodied inside midfielder with the ability to go forwards, and spent his entire time playing in the VFL. He lost weight in his time at the club to help him cover the ground more easily, but he was unable to force his way into the star-studded Geelong midfield.

Brisbane Lions (2016–2017)

Jansen was traded to the Brisbane Lions for the 2016 season. He played his first game in round 11 of the 2016 season against Carlton and played seven games for the season, struggling for consistency. He was delisted by Brisbane at the conclusion of the 2017 season after playing just eight AFL games.

Statistics
 Statistics are correct to the end of the 2017 season

|-
|-style="background-color: #EAEAEA"
! scope="row" style="text-align:center" | 2014
|style="text-align:center;"|
| 35 || — ||  — ||  — ||  — ||  — ||  — ||  — ||  — ||  — ||  — ||  — ||  — ||  — ||  — ||  —
|-
! scope="row" style="text-align:center" | 2015
|style="text-align:center;"|
| 35 || — ||  — ||  — ||  — ||  — ||  — ||  — ||  — ||  — ||  — ||  — ||  — ||  — ||  — ||  —
|-
|-style="background-color: #EAEAEA"
! scope="row" style="text-align:center" | 2016
|style="text-align:center;"|
| 16 || 7 || 4 || 1 || 33 || 68 || 101 || 15 || 27 || 0.6 || 0.1 || 4.7 || 9.7 || 14.4 || 2.1 || 3.9
|-
! scope="row" style="text-align:center" | 2017
|style="text-align:center;"|
| 16 || 1 || 0 || 0 || 7 || 4 || 11 || 5 || 1 || 0.0 || 0.0 || 7.0 || 4.0 || 11.0 || 5.0 || 1.0
|- class="sortbottom"
! colspan=3| Career
! 8
! 4
! 1
! 40
! 72
! 112
! 20
! 28
! 0.5
! 0.1
! 5.0
! 9.0
! 14.0
! 2.5
! 3.5
|}

References

External links 

1995 births
Living people
Brisbane Lions players
East Fremantle Football Club players
Australian rules footballers from Western Australia